Ian Colin (1912–1987) was a British film and television actor. During the 1930s, Colin was a leading man in Quota quickies. He later acted predominantly in television shows such as The Quatermass Experiment, Emergency-Ward 10 and Coronation Street.  He was the son of Marmaduke Wetherell and Lena McNaughton.

Selected filmography

 Cross Currents (1935)
 Late Extra (1935)
 Blue Smoke (1935)
 Men of Yesterday (1936)
 Wings Over Africa (1936)
 The Small Man (1936)
 Toilers of the Sea (1936)
 Blind Man's Bluff (1936)
 Born That Way (1936)
 It's Never Too Late to Mend (1937)
 Darts Are Trumps (1938)
 The Queen of Spades (1949)
 The Adventures of Jane (1949)
The Big Chance (1957)
 The Two-Headed Spy (1958)
 Witness in the Dark (1959)
 Dangerous Afternoon (1961)
 Strongroom (1962)

Bibliography
 Low, Rachael. ''History of the British Film: Filmmaking in 1930s Britain. George Allen & Unwin, 1985 .

References

External links
 

1912 births
1987 deaths
British male film actors
British male television actors
People from Livingstone, Zambia
20th-century British male actors